The 2006–07 Ulster Rugby season was Ulster's 13th season since the advent of professionalism in rugby union, and their third under head coach Mark McCall. They competed in the Heineken Cup and the Celtic League.

They finished fifth in the Celtic League. Andrew Trimble was the league's joint top try scorer with seven. David Humphreys was fourth top points scorer with 148, and third leading marksman with 56 successful goal kicks. They were third in their Heineken Cup pool, failing to qualify for the knockout stage. Roger Wilson was Ulster's Player of the Year.

Squad

Senior squad

Players in
 Kieron Dawson from London Irish
 Mark Bartholomeusz from Saracens
 Tom Court from Queensland Reds
 Tim Barker from Glasgow

Players out
 Shane Stewart to Newport Gwent Dragons
 Rowan Frost to Mountauban
 Rod Moore to Calvisano
 Tyrone Howe retired
 Jonny Bell retired
 Campbell Feather retired
 James Topping retired
 Reece Spee released

Academy squad

Heineken Cup

Pool 5

Celtic League

Home attendance

Ulster Rugby Awards

The Ulster Rugby Awards ceremony was held at the Ramada Hotel on 17 May 2007. Winners were:

Bank of Ireland Ulster Player of the Year: Roger Wilson
Guinness Ulster Rugby Personality of the Year: Rory Best
Vodofone Ulster Young Player of the Year: David Pollock
Kukri Sportswear Club of the Year: Dungannon RFC
First Trust Club Player of the Year: Paul Magee, Dungannon
Ken Goodall Award for Outstanding Player at the Sports Institute: Thomas Anderson
Northern Bank Schools Player of the Year: James Sandford, The Royal School, Armagh
Calor Gas Youth Player of the Year: David McGregor
Belfast Telegraph Merit Award: Simon McDowell
Dorrington B. Faulkner Award: Walter Lindsay, Civil Service Rugby Club

References

2006-07
2006–07 in Irish rugby union
2006–07 Celtic League by team
2006–07 Heineken Cup by team